Dave Archer (born David Archer Nelson on January 15, 1941) is an American reverse glass painter and sculptor.

Early life
Dave Archer Nelson was born on January 15, 1941, in San Luis Obispo, California. In an interview, Archer said he knew he wanted to be an artist ever since competing in a high school art competition at the age of 14   Archer graduated high school with a scholarship to study art with  founding member of the California Watercolor School, Phil Paradise 

In the ’60’s, working under the name, David Nelson, the artist lived and painted in San Francisco's bohemian underground art scene in the North Beach, San Francisco, during the Beat Generation. Archer’s Sixties included supporting his art by working as doorman of a folk era coffeehouse, which among others, featured entertainers Janis Joplin, Hoyt Axton, and Steve Martin at the very beginning of their professional careers.

Career 
In the 1970s, Archer was introduced to glass painting by artist Ron Russell. Their mutual friend Lee Byrd had been experimenting for years with electricity and built his own Tesla coil. Eventually, it occurred to Archer and Russell to combine Byrd’s electrical experiments with their glass paintings. After much trial and error, the trio were able develop an art process quite similar to what Archer uses in his art today.

In 1999, Archer moved to Roseburg, Oregon, from California to look after his mother, who would pass away in 2001.

In his 2002 memoirs, Archer recalls his experiences living and working in North Beach, San Francisco in various capacities, and of the characters he met there in the 1960s. Some were famous and many others, such as Hoyt Axton, Janis Joplin and Steve Martin (who got their starts in San Francisco at the Fox and Hound - later called Coffee and Confusion - where Archer worked)  were up-and-coming and later became famous.

In 2009, he took on local resident Brent Durand as his apprentice. Together they have performed million volt demonstrations at the “Elements” Gallery in Cannon Beach, Oregon and produced many paintings together.

Artwork

Archer's primary medium is reverse glass painting, which he pioneered with artist Ron Russell and Lee Byrd. The technique consists of applying paint or pigment to the underside of a glass plate then applying a million volts of electricity generated from a Tesla coil to disperse the paint into randomly generated patterns. This gives the painting a space like quality.

Since the 70's, the artist's painting machines were designed and built by the late, Bill Wysock, noted master Tesla-coil engineer, builder and producer of special lightning effects for countless Hollywood movies. Archer's coils are specifically designed for his painting needs.

Recently, Archer has begun sculpting using found object armatures, which he then covers with an activated resin substance, using various tools to make impressions which he refers to as “markings”, then adding pigments of various colors to highlight the impressions.

Fame
Dave Archer's paintings have been featured on Star Trek, decorating the Enterprise set on the television series Star Trek: The Next Generation, received screen credit in the movie Star Trek VI: The Undiscovered Country, and was included in Star Trek Generations.

He has demonstrated the reverse-glass painting technique on over two hundred television series, including, "Eye to Eye With Connie Chung", "Beyond 2000", and Discovery Channel's "The Next Step" and "World's of Wonder".

Archer's paintings have been on numerous book jackets including: Fantasy and Earth by Isaac Asimov; N-Space and Playgrounds of the Mind by Larry Niven; Music Physician by Don Campbell; The Oxygen Barons by Gregory Feeley; The Starry Rift and the Crown of Stars by James Tiptree, Jr.; Alastor and Planet of Adventure by Jack Vance as well as the Vance Anthology of City of the Chasch / Servants of the Wankh / The Dirdir / The Pnume

In the print media, Archer's work was featured in Omni and National Geographic Magazine. He has also appeared in Ripley’s Believe It or Not! Sunday newspaper comic.

Shows
Archer's work has been shown in the world headquarters of AT&T on Madison Avenue in New York City, and the Hayden Planetarium in Central Park in New York.

Books
Archer's first book, Survival Art, Painting and Sculpting for Food, Clothing and Shelter’’, was published by Coyotel Press in 2009. 
In 2009, Coyotel Press also published his collaboration with Steve Hapy, Will Taylor, and Steven Johnson Leyba titled The Trickster’s Bible: A Never Ending Book''.

Chronology
 1941: ARCHER, DAVE, painter and sculptor, born David Archer Nelson, in San Luis Obispo, January , 1941
 1961: Elysian Art Gallery, San Francisco, California
 1965: Unicorn Gallery, San Francisco, California
 1965: Joker's Flux Gallery, San Francisco, California
 1967: City Lights Bookstore, San Francisco, California
 1967: Running Elk Gallery, San Francisco, California
 1973: De Poliolo Gallery, Palm Springs, California
 1974: William Stone Gallery, San Francisco, California
 1974: Robinson's Red Door Gallery, Morro Bay, California
 1974: Erickson's Gallery, Tiburon, California
 1975: M.H. de Young Museum, San Francisco, California
 1977: Glass Art Gallery, San Rafael, California
 1978: Amber Gallery, San Francisco, California
 1979: Westheimer Art Festival, Houston, Texas
 1979: Sausalito Art Festival, California
 1980: Laguna Beach Art Festival, California
 1980: The Boulevard - Las Vegas, Nevada
 1980: Tapestry in Talent - San Jose, California
 1981: Mill Valley Fall Arts Festival, California
 1981: Omni Magazine Art Show, Marshall Fields' Dept. Store, Chicago
 1982: MGM Grand Hotel, Reno, Nevada
 1982: Sheraton Hotel - Steamboat Springs, Colorado
 1982: "I Got Reemed In Reem" Art Show - Reem, California
 1983: Kersting Gallery, Sausalito, California
 1983-1988,1991-1995: Swanson Art Galleries, San Francisco, California
 1987: Celebration of Innovation, San Francisco, California
 1988: Planetarium, Brussels, Belgium
 1989: Jacqueline Westbrook Gallery, La Jolla, California
 1989: Dyansen Gallery, San Francisco, California
 1989: Gallery San Francisco - San Francisco, California
 1989: The Royal Art Gallery, Lahaina, Maui, Hawaii
 1989: The Pendragon Gallery, Annapolis, Maryland
 1989: Roy's Gallery, Lawrence, Kansas
 1989: The Omniversum, The Hague, Netherlands - One Man Show - Permanent Collection
 1989: Imagine Tokyo `89, Tokyo, Japan
 1989: Gallery Alternative, San Jose, California
 1989: Addi Gallery of Coronado, California
 1990: Phoenix Gallery, Topeka, Kansas
 1990: San Luis Obispo Art Center, San Luis Obispo, California - One Man Homecoming Show
 1990: Just Looking Gallery, San Luis Obispo, California
 1990: The AT&T World Headquarters, New York, New York - One Man Show - Permanent - Collection & Exhibit
 1990: Dyansen Gallery, San Francisco, California
 1990-1991: Dorog Gallery, Beverly Hills, California
 1990-1991: Hayden Planetarium, Central Park, New York -One Man Show- Permanent Collection
 1990: BENEFIT Show - Stop The Buck - With entertainment by Grace Slick and Friends – Novato, California
 1991: Von Der Ahe Galleries, Ltd., Monterey, California
 1991: Dyansen Gallery, San Francisco, California
 1991: The Vault Gallery, Cambria, California
 1991: Ship Store Gallery, Kauai, Hawaii
 1991: Tower Gallery, Sacramento, California
 1991: Angel City Gallery, Los Angeles, California
 1991: Brandywine Fantasy Gallery, Chicago, Illinois
 1991: BENEFIT Show - Fairfax - San Anselmo Children's Center – Novato, California
 1991: Chi-Con - World Science Fiction Convention, Chicago, Illinois
 1991: Museum of Science and Industry, Chicago, Illinois - Permanent Collection
 1991: Whole Life Expo, San Jose, California
 1992: Off The Wall Gallery - Huntington Beach, California
 1992: Off The Wall Gallery - Newport Beach, California
 1992: The Vault Gallery – Cambria, California
 1992: Seldom Scene Gallery – Fairfax, California - With Stanley Mouse, Ralph McQuarrie and Mati Klarwein
 1992: Metropolitan Art Gallery – Lahaina, Maui, Hawaii
 1992: Hudson River Museum – Yonkers, New York
 1993: The Infinite Line Of Piero Manzoni - Milan, Italy - Invitational
 1993: BENEFIT Show – Fairfax, San Anselmo Children's Center – Novato, California
 1993: 4th Annual Mythical Realism Exhibit - Brandywine Fantasy Gallery – Chicago, Illinois
 1993: Weinstein Gallery - San Francisco, California
 1993: Artisan's Gallery Group Invitational - Mill Valley, California
 1993: Vault Gallery - Cambria, California
 1995: The Seekers Collection & Gallery - Cambria, California
 1995: The Glass Eye Gallery - Seattle, Washington - 1995
 1995: Southern Wind - Kinetic / Op Art Gallery - New Orleans, Louisiana
 1996: Shibuya Pantheon - Tokyo - Japan - Premier /Star Trek Generations 
 1996: Panasonic World Headquarters – Shinagawa, Japan
 1996: Yountchi - Rieger Fine Art - San Francisco, California
 1997: The Glass Eye Gallery - Seattle, Washington
 1997: Danskin Galleries - Palm Desert, California
 1997: Yountchi-Rieger Fine Art - San Francisco, California
 1998: Gallery Harvest – Nagoya, Japan
 1998: The Marceline Bonorden Gallery of Fine Art - New Orleans, Louisiana
 1998-2001: Rieger Fine Art / Artist's Studio Show and Sale – Novato, California
 1998-2003: Gallery Harvest - Nogoya - Japan - November - 1998
 2002: Art Encounter - Las Vegas - Nevada - 2002
 2003: Danville Fine Arts Gallery - "Technology Creates" – Danville, California

References

External links
Dave Archer Homepage
Recent News Article

1941 births
20th-century American painters
American male painters
21st-century American painters
21st-century American male artists
Living people
20th-century American sculptors
20th-century American male artists
American male sculptors
People from Roseburg, Oregon